Ernest R. Davidson, born October 12, 1936 in Terre Haute, Indiana, was Professor of Chemistry, University of Washington, Seattle, WA, US (1961 - 1984, 2002 - 2020) and Indiana University, Bloomington, IN, US (1984 - 2002). He graduated from Wiley High School, Terre Haute and Rose Polytechnic Institute (BS Chemical Engineering), Terre Haute, and Indiana University (PhD Theoretical Chemistry), Bloomington, IN.

His name is associated with both the Davidson correction and the "Davidson diagonalization" method which he applied to configuration interaction methods. He is the author of over 400 publications, including Reduced Density Matrices in Quantum Chemistry, Academic Press, 1976.

He has been awarded many honors, including  member of the International Academy of Quantum Molecular Science (1981) and Fellow of the American Association for the Advancement of Science (1985) and the National Academy of Sciences (1987). In 2001, he was awarded the National Medal of Science.

References
 
 His International Academy of Quantum Molecular Science page

External links
 His home page containing all his publications.

1936 births
Living people
Members of the United States National Academy of Sciences
National Medal of Science laureates
Members of the International Academy of Quantum Molecular Science
Fellows of the American Physical Society
Theoretical chemists
Rose–Hulman Institute of Technology alumni
Schrödinger Medal recipients
Computational chemists